Ousmane Baldé (died 1971) was a Guinean economist and politician. He was President of the Central Bank of the Republic of Guinea 1963-1964, and served as a Minister of Economy and Finance. He was accused of being a mercenary in the Portuguese invasion of Guinea, arrested, and hanged without trial in 1971 along with Ibrahima Barry, Magassouba Moriba, Kaita Kara de Soufiane and others.

References

20th-century Guinean economists
Year of birth missing
1971 deaths
Governors of the Central Bank of Guinea
Government ministers of Guinea
Finance ministers of Guinea
People executed by Guinea by hanging
Executed Guinean people
People executed for treason against Guinea
20th-century executions for treason
Executed politicians